Balloon was a brush script commonly used for signage or display purposes. It was designed in 1939 by Max R. Kaufmann, for American Type Founders, in response to Howard Allen Trafton's Cartoon, cut for Bauer Type Foundry in 1936. It had no lowercase letters and was cast in Light, Bold, and Extra Bold. The two lighter weights were identical with Kaufmann Script and so could be used as alternate capitals for that face. It was most notably used in the Madeline books, TV series and film. The font was most famously known for the typeface of the Nickelodeon logo from late 1984 to 2009 in white letters with an orange splat background.

This font was digitized by the now-defunct Bitstream Inc.

References

American Type Founders typefaces
Casual script typefaces
Typefaces and fonts introduced in 1939
Typefaces designed by Max R. Kaufmann